The Alph River is a small river in Antarctica, running into Walcott Bay, Victoria Land. It is in an ice-free region at the west of the Koettlitz Glacier, Scott Coast. The Alph emerges from Trough Lake and flows through Walcott Lake, Howchin Lake, and Alph Lake. It ends in a subglacial flow beneath Koettlitz Glacier to McMurdo Sound.

The river was named by Thomas Griffith Taylor, member of the Terra Nova Expedition of 1911–1913, who explored the portion north of Pyramid Trough. He took the name from the opening passage of Samuel Taylor Coleridge's poem Kubla Khan, as the stream continues north a considerable distance under moraine and ultimately subglacially beneath Koettlitz Glacier to the Ross Sea. The nearby Xanadu Hills are named from the same poem.

See also
Onyx River
List of rivers of Antarctica

References

Rivers of Victoria Land
Scott Coast